In 2000, 1. deild was the top tier league in Faroe Islands football (since 2005, the top tier has been the Faroe Islands Premier League, with 1. deild becoming the second tier).

This article details the statistics of Faroe Islands Premier League Football in the 2000 season.

Overview
It was contested by 10 teams, and VB Vágur won the championship.

League standings

Results
The schedule consisted of a total of 18 games. Each team played two games against every opponent in no particular order. One of the games was at home and one was away.

Top goalscorers
Source: faroesoccer.com

16 goals
 Súni Fríði Barbá (B68)

15 goals
 Marcello Marcelino (B68)

14 goals
 Krzysztof Popczyński (VB)

13 goals
 Súni Olsen (GÍ)

11 goals
 Andrew av Fløtum (HB)
 Dánial Hansen (NSÍ)

10 goals
 Ove Nysted (KÍ)

9 goals
 Christian Høgni Jacobsen (NSÍ)
 Robert Cieślewicz (VB)

1. deild seasons
Faroe
Faroe
1